Gathurst railway station is a two-platform railway station on the outskirts of the Metropolitan Borough of Wigan, Greater Manchester, England. The station also serves the nearby village of Shevington, indeed until 1973 (see British Rail Timetable of 1972) was named Gathurst for Shevington. It is currently operated by Northern Trains.

The main stone-built station building survives adjacent to the Wigan-bound platform, but is now in use for non-railway purposes (as a public house), modest shelters now being provided on both platforms for rail travellers.

History
The station was built by the Manchester and Southport Railway and opened on 9 April 1855, and from January 1885 was part of the Lancashire and Yorkshire Railway (L&YR). The main stone-built station building (no longer in use) was built during this time, in the standard L&YR style. The L&YR amalgamated with the London and North Western Railway on 1 January 1922 and in turn was grouped into the London, Midland and Scottish Railway (LMS) in 1923. Nationalisation followed in 1948. When Sectorisation was introduced in the 1980s, the station was served by Regional Railways until the privatisation of British Rail. The goods yard served as an exchange with the ICI Nobels Roburite Works narrow gauge railway.

Facilities
The station is unmanned and has no ticket machine, so all tickets must be bought prior to travel or on the train. Train running information can be obtained by phone and timetable posters. There is step-free access to both platforms.

Services
On Monday to Saturday daytimes, there are two trains an hour westbound to Southport and eastbound to Wigan. Only a limited number now run via , mainly at peak times and late evenings (travellers to these destinations and for stations along the Calder Valley line now need to change at Wigan).

Sunday services are hourly each way and continue to  eastbound.

References

External links

Railway stations in the Metropolitan Borough of Wigan
DfT Category F1 stations
Former Lancashire and Yorkshire Railway stations
Northern franchise railway stations
Railway stations in Great Britain opened in 1855